The 2006 United States Senate election in North Dakota was held November 7, 2006. Incumbent Democratic-NPL U.S. Senator Kent Conrad won re-election to a fourth term.

Major candidates

Democratic-NPL 
 Kent Conrad, incumbent U.S. Senator

Republican 
Dwight Grotberg

Campaign 
Popular Republican governor John Hoeven was heavily recruited by prominent national Republicans, including Karl Rove and Dick Cheney to run against Conrad.  SurveyUSA polls showed that both Conrad and Hoeven had among the highest approval ratings of any Senators and governors in the nation. A poll conducted by PMR (8/26-9/3 MoE 3.9) for The Forum of Fargo-Moorhead had as result for a hypothetical matchup: Hoeven-35%, Conrad-27%, Uncommitted-38%. This poll showed voter conflict between two very popular politicians in a small state where  party loyalty is often trumped by personality. In late September 2005, Hoeven formally declined. Hoeven ran for the Senate in 2010 and was elected by a landslide, in that year's Republican midterm wave.

Debates
Complete video of debate, October 17, 2006

Predictions

Polling

Results 

Conrad won at least 53% of the vote in every county in the state.

See also 
 2006 United States Senate elections
 2006 United States House of Representatives election in North Dakota
 2006 North Dakota state elections

References

External links 
Official campaign websites (Archived)
 Conrad's campaign website
 Grotberg's campaign website

North Dakota
2006
2006 North Dakota elections